Didsbury railway station is a former station in Didsbury, in the southern suburbs of Manchester, England, United Kingdom. The station was located on Wilmslow Road, just north of the junction with Barlow Moor Road and opposite Didsbury Library. Nothing now remains of the old station buildings, which have been demolished, but the surviving white Portland stone clock tower is a local landmark. Didsbury is now served by Didsbury Village tram stop which is close to the site of the former railway station.

History

In 1873, the Manchester South District Railway obtained permission to construct a new railway line from Manchester to Alderley. The company fell into financial difficulty and was eventually bought out by the Midland Railway in 1877, who went on to build the line.

The line ran south through Didsbury via a cutting, passing underneath Wilmslow Road. Didsbury Station was situated on the east side of Wilmslow Road, set back from the road with a small forecourt area. The station building was a red brick Gothic Revival house with a booking office, ladies' and gentlemen's waiting rooms and an adjacent station master's house. There were two platforms in the cutting with glass canopies and a footbridge. Didsbury was served initially by the South District Service commuter route, and from August 1880 by express trains running from Manchester Central to London St Pancras.

Didsbury's location on the network ensured frequent services. From 1901 the MR opened a new route to  via  and peak-time services through Didsbury reached over 38 trains per hour in each direction.

Around 1910, a memorial clock was erected in the station forecourt dedicated to local philanthropist John Milson Rhodes (1847-1909). The  clock tower is built of Portland stone in an Edwardian Baroque style and incorporates a pair of drinking fountains. On one side there is a bronze plaque which displays a relief medallion portrait of Rhodes and the inscription .

From 1923, the MR was absorbed into the LMS, and after 1948 the line became part of British Rail. In the postwar period, while the South District Service declined in frequency, Manchester Central-London express services increased, although the new Blue Pullmans did not call at Didsbury but at  instead.

Closure
When the former London & North Western Railway line from  became the principal route for London express trains, the South District Line lost its importance; the route and its stations were listed for closure in the Beeching cuts. The last train to depart from Didsbury was the 18:45 express to London St Pancras on 2 January 1967. Passenger express and freight trains continued to run through Didsbury until the line was fully closed in 1969.

The station building remained standing for a number of years and was used as a hardware store, Didsbury Station Hardwre. After the store closed, the building fell derelict and was demolished in 1982.

Line re-opening

The former South District Line lay derelict for several decades. In 1984, Greater Manchester Council and Greater Manchester Passenger Transport Executive announced the Project Light Rail scheme to develop a new light rail/tram system by re-opening use of disused railway lines in the region, including the route through Didsbury. The first phase of the Manchester Metrolink system opened in 1992, but it was not until 2013 that the network was expanded to reach Didsbury. Tram tracks were laid along the former trackbed, but as Didsbury station had been demolished over 30 years earlier, it was decided to locate the new Didsbury Village tram stop further down the line on School Lane.

Nothing remains today of the old Midland Railway station building, and the site today is occupied by a row of shops and pubs. The station clock is still standing and is a local landmark.

See also
Sheffield and Midland Railway Companies' Committee
Midland Railway
Withington and West Didsbury railway station

References

Citations

Sources

External links

Didsbury
Former Midland Railway stations
Railway stations in Great Britain opened in 1880
Railway stations in Great Britain closed in 1967
Manchester South District Line
Beeching closures in England